"Bandolero" is a song by Belgian group Paradisio. It was originally released in 1996 in Belgium as the second  single from their debut album, Paradisio (1997). It reached the top 20 in Belgium and was re-released in March 1998, where it reached number 11 in Italy and number 92 in France.

Music video
The accompanying music video for "Bandolero" was filmed in 1996.

Track listings
 CD maxi, Belgium (1996)
 "Bandolero" (Discoteca Action Remix) - 7:05 	
 "Bandolero" (Discoteca Action Remix - Short Mix) - 4:13 	
 "Bandolero" (After Party Remix) - 6:00 	
 "Bandolero" (Video Edit) - 3:54 	
 "Bandolero" (U.S. Power Club Remix) - 7:43

Charts

References

1996 singles
1996 songs
English-language Belgian songs
Paradisio songs